Kenneth Svendsen (born 2 August 1954 in Fauske) is a Norwegian politician for the Progress Party.

Biography
He was elected to the Norwegian Parliament from Nordland in 1997, and has been re-elected on two occasions.

Svendsen held various positions in Fauske municipality council from 1987 to 2007. From 1991 to 1999 he was also a member of Nordland county council.

He is vice-president of the Storting since 2009.

References

1960 births
Living people
Members of the Storting
Progress Party (Norway) politicians
Norwegian Christians
21st-century Norwegian politicians
20th-century Norwegian politicians
People from Fauske